The Taipei Metro Fuxinggang station (formerly transliterated as Fuhsing Kang Station until 2003) is located in Beitou District, Taipei, Taiwan. It is a station on the Tamsui Line. In the past, the station belonged to the now-defunct TRA Tamsui Line. 

The name of the station is derived from the nearby Fu Hsing Kang College, a military academy. The Taipei Metro Beitou Depot is located directly south of the station.

Station overview

The at-grade, station structure with two side platforms and exit to Zhongyang North Road. The washrooms are inside the entrance area.

History
This station was opened temporarily as Shenyunhui Station, a TRA railway station, from October 25 to 31, 1954 for the national sports day event held at Fu Hsing Kang College. The metro station was opened on 28 March 1997.

Station layout

First and Last Train Timing 
The first and last train timing at Fuxinggang station  is as follows:

References

Tamsui–Xinyi line stations
Railway stations opened in 1954
Railway stations closed in 1954
Railway stations opened in 1997